Nickolas Mohanna is an American artist and composer based in New York. His interdisciplinary practice utilizes a variety of media to explore and blur the borders between music, sound art, video and drawing. Within his compositions there is a "tendency of sculpting and orchestrating a minimal array of sounds into sonically rich and spacious atmospheres." Most of the sounds are sourced from local environments. While certain tracks "bury melodies in multiple layers of distortion to reveal their latent chromatic richness through gradually mutating textural contrast." And the "consistent tone makes it all flow together like raindrops forming a lake." In a Village Voice interview, he remarks that his aim is to create an "immersive stereo space where the sound would be reduced to its rawest form." In addition to these works, he has also published a number of artists' books which have served as visual accompaniments, conceptual ideas, or graphic scores to his sonic practice on the imprint Run/Off; which he founded in 2014. Mohanna attended San Francisco State University and went to the University of California, Davis for an MFA in Art Studio. While there he took courses with Bob Ostertag, Annabeth Rosen, Douglas Kahn, and Wayne Thiebaud.

Discography
Hunting Horns US, New York, NY. Abandon Ship Records, Ltd. CD 2008. 

In Embers US, Los Angeles, CA, Stunned Records, Ltd. CD 2009. 

The Relative Middle US, MN, Small Doses, Ltd. CD 2009. 

Birth To A Point UK, Blackest Rainbow, Ltd. CD. 2009.

Optics Japan, Slow Flow Rec, Ltd. CD 2010. 

Transmission Hue UK, Low Point, Ltd. CD 2010. 

Reflectors Australia, Preservation, Ltd. CD 2011.

Various – 14 Tracks: Kafkaesque UK, Boomkat, File, MP3, Compilation. 2011

Parallax View UK, Low Point, Ltd LP. 2013

Control Group Denmark, Metaphysical Circuits, Ltd cassette. 2013

Phase Line US, Run/Off Editions & WFMU Free Music Archive, Digital/CD. 2015

Mantis Australia, Preservation, Ltd cassette. 2016

Chroma Germany, Karlrecords, Ltd LP. 2017 

Karl Marx's 200th Germany, Karlrecords, Ltd Compilation CD. 2018 

Smoke US, Aagoo Records, Ltd LP. 2019

Various – The Wire Tapper 51 UK, The Wire Tapper, CD. 2019

Throwing The Chain Australia, Longform Editions, File, FLAC. 2019

Parakustiks Germany, Karlrecords, File, MP3, Album, Compilation. 2020 

Nerve PlexusBelgium,Dadaist Tapes, Ltd. Tape/DL, MP3, Album, 2021 

 Sight Drawings US, New York, Run/Off, Ltd. LP/DL, MP3, Album, 2022

Books / Prints
Theater. France: Kaugummi, 2010.  
Particles Brooklyn, New York: Medium Rare, 2010.  
 France: Lendroit éditions, 2011. Offset poster publication. Edition of 1000.
  France: Lendroit éditions, 2011. .
Floodlights Brooklyn, New York: Oso Press, 2012. 
Boundaries  Los Angeles, CA: The Ice Plant, 2012. Edition of 100.
LAND New York, New York: Run/Off Editions, 2015. .
Heat Death  France: Lendroit éditions, 2017. .
Spin Group New York, New York: Run/Off Editions, 2021. .

Film / Video
His video and film work have been used in both gallery installations and for live sound performances; using a range of computer animation, found video, or appropriated footage. Many of them have mirrored various sound compositions by using collage or distortion to explore electronic & acoustic processes. 

Ruins, video projection, 16mm film transferred to video, 3:50 min, black/white, sound, 2008
Ceremony, video, 5:20 min, color, sound, 2010
Elements, 16mm film transferred to video 3:50 min, color, sound, 2011
Generator, video projection, 2:00 min, black/white, sound, 2013
Passage, video projection, 4:56 min, black/white, sound, 2015
Quadrant, video projection, 2:00 min, color, sound, 2017
Subsystem, video projection, animation, 6:17 min, black/white, sound, 2018
Beam & Column, video projection, 2:00 min, color, sound, 2019

Collections
His artists' books have been archived at the Franklin Furnace Archive, Whitney Museum of American Art, National Gallery of Art, Museum of Modern Art New York, Los Angeles County Museum, Dallas Museum of Art, Cleveland Museum of Art, New York Public Library (Spencer Collection), Museum Ludwig (Cologne), and Stedelijk Museum Amsterdam.

References

External links 

 Bandcamp
 Run/Off Editions
 Discography

Living people
American sound artists
American contemporary artists
New media artists
American electronic musicians
American experimental musicians
University of California, Davis alumni
Year of birth missing (living people)